Ali Aliyev Sport Complex (Arena) is an indoor sports arena situated in Kaspiysk, Russia. The arena usually hosts basketball, volleyball, judo, futsal. It also hosts other tournaments with high attendance.

History
The arena was built on 22 may, 2011 in Kaspiysk close to the capital city of Dagestan Makhachkala. This arena was named in memory of the first freestyle wrestling world champion of Dagestan: Ali Aliyev. The first event was held in the arena was the FILA freestyle wrestling world cup 2011.

This arena hosts an international freestyle wrestling tournament in memory of Ali Aliyev.

Events & tournaments
Freestyle wrestling world cup 2011.
2014 Russian volleyball cup semi-finals.
Fight Nights: Dagestan.
2015 Russian National Freestyle Wrestling Championships.
2018 European Wrestling Championships.
Fight Nights Global 94.

References

External links

Sports venues completed in 2011
Basketball venues in Russia
Handball venues in Russia
Indoor arenas in Russia
Boxing venues in Russia